Lee Jenkins (born 28 June 1979 in Pontypool) is a Welsh professional footballer who most recently played Welsh Premier League side Carmarthen Town.

Playing career
He progressed through the Swansea City set-up and was a first team regular for several seasons at either right back or in midfield. A nasty cheek eye socket facture during a FA cup match vs Bristol city ended hopes of a big money move to Newcastle, as kenny Dalglish was a big friend of Jan molby and Jan highly recommended Lee. however Lee did go on win a championship medal in 2000 and played a vital part in Swansea great escape in 2003, Lee was an unsung hero. He then moved to Kidderminster Harriers and taking his total of league appearances beyond 200. He signed for Newport County in October 2005 after a brief spell at Redditch United. He left Newport in February 2007 after a series of bad knee injuries. After playing for Caersws during the 2009–10 season, Jenkins signed for Carmarthen Town in June 2010. Jenkins earned Welsh representative honours from schoolboy up to under-21 level. He earned 12 under 21s caps playing alongside the likes of Craig Bellamy, Simon Davies, Danny Gabbidon and Rob Earnshaw.

References

External links

Welsh Premier profile

1979 births
Living people
Association football midfielders
Welsh footballers
Wales youth international footballers
Wales under-21 international footballers
Swansea City A.F.C. players
Kidderminster Harriers F.C. players
Redditch United F.C. players
Newport County A.F.C. players
Carmarthen Town A.F.C. players
English Football League players
Cymru Premier players
Caersws F.C. players
Footballers from Pontypool